Moore railway station may refer to:

 Moore railway station, England
 Moore Station, Texas